Álvaro Clausí Marín (born 7 April 1993) is a Spanish footballer who plays for CF Villanovense as an attacking midfielder.

Club career
Born in Alicante, Clausí was formed as a player in local Alicante CF, making his senior debuts still as a junior with the reserve side. In 2011, he joined Valencian Community neighbours Hércules CF to complete his grooming.

Clausí played his first game as a professional on the first day of the 2012–13 season, coming on as a 71st-minute substitute for Fran Mérida in a 0–1 away loss against CD Lugo in the Segunda División. On 23 July 2013, he was loaned to Segunda División B club CD Alcoyano.

On 27 July 2014, Clausí signed for RCD Mallorca B, also in the third division. On 19 August 2016, he moved to fellow league team CE Sabadell FC.

References

External links

1993 births
Living people
Footballers from Alicante
Spanish footballers
Association football midfielders
Segunda División players
Segunda División B players
Tercera División players
Hércules CF B players
Hércules CF players
CD Alcoyano footballers
RCD Mallorca B players
CE Sabadell FC footballers
CD Eldense footballers
Ontinyent CF players
Rápido de Bouzas players
CF Villanovense players